The discography of Man's Ruin Records, a defunct independent record label, founded by Frank Kozik.

Discography

See also 
 Man's Ruin Records

References
 http://www.mansruinrecords.de
 http://www.s-line.de/homepages/wullewatz/mansruin/
 http://www.grunnenrocks.nl/label/m/mansruin.htm
 https://web.archive.org/web/20090729100936/http://forbiddeneye.com/labels/mansruin.html
 https://web.archive.org/web/20050908015954/http://www.sonsofalphacentauri.co.uk/extras/mansruin/mr.html

Discographies of American record labels